Greatest Hits: Limited Edition is a compilation of American country music artist Tim McGraw's first two greatest hits albums. Initially sold exclusively at Wal-Mart, it was released on April 29, 2008, and entered Billboard's Top Country Albums chart at #1, selling 29,000 copies in its first week of release. The album was made available at other retailers on August 26, 2008.

Track listing

Charts

Weekly charts

Year-end charts

References

2008 greatest hits albums
Tim McGraw albums
Albums produced by Byron Gallimore
Curb Records compilation albums
Albums produced by Tim McGraw